A conservative replacement (also called a conservative mutation or a conservative substitution) is an amino acid replacement in a protein that changes a given amino acid to a different amino acid with similar biochemical properties (e.g. charge, hydrophobicity and size).

Conversely, a radical replacement, or radical substitution, is an amino acid replacement that exchanges an initial amino acid by a final amino acid with different physicochemical properties.

Description 

There are 20 naturally occurring amino acids, however some of these share similar characteristics. For example, leucine and isoleucine are both aliphatic, branched hydrophobes. Similarly, aspartic acid and glutamic acid are both small, negatively charged residues. 

Although there are many ways to classify amino acids, they are often sorted into six main classes on the basis of their structure and the general chemical characteristics of their side chains (R groups).

Physicochemical distances aim at quantifying the intra-class and inter-class dissimilarity between amino acids based on their measurable properties, and many such measures have been proposed in the literature. Owing to their simplicity, two of the most commonly used measures are the ones of Grantham (1974) and Miyata et al (1979). A conservative replacement is therefore an exchange between two amino acids separated by a small physicochemical distance. Conversely, a radical replacement is an exchange between two amino acids separated by a large physicochemical distance.

Impact on function 
Conservative replacements in proteins often have a better effect on function than non-conservative replacements. The reduced effect of conservative replacements on function can also be seen in the occurrence of different replacements in nature. Non-conservative replacements between proteins are far more likely to be removed by natural selection due to their deleterious effects.

See also 

 Segregating site
 Ultra-conserved element
 Sequence alignment
 Sequence alignment software

References 

Biochemistry
Amino acids